The Autovía A-65 is a proposed upgrade of the N-610 (Carretera) is a highway in central Spain.  It connects Benavente with Palencia.

It starts at junction 257 km on the Autovía A-6 north of Madrid in the Tierra de Campos.  It heads east and after 39 km reaches Becilla de Valeraduey and a junction with the N-601.   The road continues east over an undulating plain and after 61 km reaches Palencia overlooked by the Mirador de Tierra de Campos.  The road crosses the Rio Pisuerga the Autovía A-62 and the N-611 / A-67.

References 

A-65
A-65